Joanne Sharon Crofford (born October 29, 1947) is a former MLA for Regina Rosemont, Saskatchewan, and a member of the Saskatchewan New Democratic Party.

She was born Joanne Sharon Elkin in Regina, the daughter of Hubert Elkin and Elsie Lillian Kozen. Crofford has lived and worked throughout Saskatchewan, including the North. She graduated from the University of Regina, majoring in Social Studies and Communications.

Crofford's 12 years of work in La Ronge included Assistant Director of Personnel with the Department of Northern Saskatchewan, representative to the provincial Environment Impact Assessment Secretariat and Business Manager of the Kikinahk Indian and Métis Friendship Centre. On her return to Regina, Crofford was Program Co-ordinator at the Rainbow Youth Centre and Research Co-ordinator at the Faculty of Social Work at the University of Regina.

Crofford was first elected in October 1991 as the MLA for Regina Lake Centre, and subsequently re-elected for Regina Centre and Regina Rosemont (due to boundary changes). Since her appointment to Cabinet in February 1995, Crofford has served in a wide variety of portfolios, including Minister Responsible for the Saskatchewan Property Management Corporation, Minister Responsible for the Status of Women, Minister Responsible for the Saskatchewan Liquor and Gaming Authority, Minister Responsible for the Indian and Métis Affairs Secretariat, Minister of Post-Secondary Education and Skills Training and Minister Responsible for the Saskatchewan Communications Network, Minister of Labour, Minister of Culture, Youth and Recreation, Minister Responsible for the Public Service Commission, as well as for the Wascana Centre Authority and the Saskatchewan Gaming Corporation.

In 2001, Crofford was a candidate for the leadership of the provincial NDP.

She was re-elected as the MLA for Regina Rosemont on November 5, 2003.  On November 21, 2003, Crofford was appointed Minister of Community Resources and Employment, Minister Responsible for Disability Issues and as well as Minister Responsible for Gaming. In January 2006, Crofford announced that she would not run for re-election.

She has served in cultural, artistic, human rights, youth labour, business and community service organizations. She was chair of the Regina Opening Ceremonies event for the 1995 Grey Cup, founder of the Cathedral Village Drum Circle and continues to serve on the Cathedral Village Arts Festival and other community committees.

The Saskatchewan Centre of International Languages has awarded her an Honorary Certificate in Languages for her support of international language instruction.

Crofford's long involvement in the Saskatchewan community has led to her firm commitment to a close working relationship between government and all sectors of our society.

Crofford and her husband Vic reside in Regina Centre.

References 

Saskatchewan New Democratic Party MLAs
Members of the Executive Council of Saskatchewan
Women MLAs in Saskatchewan
1947 births
Living people
Politicians from Regina, Saskatchewan
21st-century Canadian politicians
21st-century Canadian women politicians
Women government ministers of Canada